Kurylenko or Kurilenko is a Ukrainian surname. Notable people with the surname include:

 Gennady Kurilenko ( 1944–2013), Ukrainian speedway rider
 Olga Kurylenko (born 1979), Ukrainian-French actress
 Vasyl Kurylenko (1890–1921), Ukrainian military commander

Ukrainian-language surnames